Pyrgomorpha is the type genus of grasshoppers in the family Pyrgomorphidae and the tribe Pyrgomorphini. Species are found in Southern Europe, Africa and the middle East, through to India and Mongolia.

Species
The Orthoptera Species File lists the following:
sub-genus Phymelloides Kevan & Akbar, 1963
Pyrgomorpha angolensis Bolívar, 1889
Pyrgomorpha granulata Stål, 1875
Pyrgomorpha johnseni Schmidt, 1999
Pyrgomorpha rugosa Key, 1937 (a.k.a. Pyrgomorpha (Phymelloides) rugosus)
Pyrgomorpha vignaudi Guérin-Méneville, 1849
sub-genus Pyrgomorpha Serville, 1838
Pyrgomorpha agarena Bolívar, 1894
Pyrgomorpha albotaeniata Werner, 1908
Pyrgomorpha bispinosa Walker, 1870
Pyrgomorpha brachycera Kirby, 1914
Pyrgomorpha cognata Krauss, 1877
Pyrgomorpha conica Olivier, 1791 - type species (as Acrydium conicum Olivier)
Pyrgomorpha cypria Bolívar, 1901
Pyrgomorpha granosa Stål, 1876
Pyrgomorpha granulata Stål, 1875
Pyrgomorpha guentheri Burr, 1899
Pyrgomorpha hemiptera Uvarov, 1938
Pyrgomorpha inaequalipennis Bolívar, 1904
Pyrgomorpha lepineyi Chopard, 1943
Pyrgomorpha minuta Kevan, 1963
Pyrgomorpha tricarinata Bolívar, 1884
Pyrgomorpha vignaudi Guérin-Méneville, 1849
Pyrgomorpha vosseleri Uvarov, 1923

Gallery

References

External links

Caelifera genera
Pyrgomorphidae